The men's 100 metres T47 event at the 2020 Summer Paralympics in Tokyo, took place on 27 August 2021.

Records
Prior to the competition, the existing records were as follows:

Results

Heats
Heat 1 took place on 27 August 2021, at 12:29:

Heat 2 took place on 27 August 2021, at 12:36:

Final
The final took place on 27 August 2021, at 19:33:

References

Men's 100 metres T47
2021 in men's athletics